The Estadio José Ortega Martínez  also known as Valley Bowl Stadium, is a stadium of football with capacity for 3,700 people  located in Naucalpan, State of Mexico, campus Lomas Verdes Universidad del Valle de Mexico. The stadium is the home team american football representative of the university, the Linces Lomas Verdes.

The property had a cost of over 100 million pesos and was opened to house the major league games of the ONEFA from the 2010 season. The stadium has synthetic grass, bucket seats, dressing rooms, bathrooms, electronic scoreboard, food area, large capacity light lighting, and a press box for the height of the yard 50.

References 

College American football venues in Mexico
Jose Ortega Martinez
Sport in the State of Mexico
Naucalpan de Juárez
2010 establishments in Mexico
Sports venues completed in 2010